Aspidosperma ulei is a timber tree native to Brazil, Venezuela, Colombia, Guyana, and Suriname.

References

ulei
Trees of South America
Flora of Brazil
Flora of Colombia
Flora of Venezuela
Flora of South America
Plants described in 1924